Adil Chihi (born 21 February 1988) is a professional footballer who most recently played as a midfielder for IR Tanger. Born in Germany, he represented Morocco at international level.

Club career
On 23 July 2014, Chihi joined English side Fulham on a free transfer to play in the Championship.

On 27 February 2016, Chihi signed a contract with Persian Gulf Pro League club Esteghlal until the end of the season. He was assigned the shirt number 23 by the club.

International career
Chihi made his first appearance for the Morocco national team in the friendly match against Benin on 20 August 2008.

Honours
1. FC Köln
2 Bundesliga: 2013–14

References

External links
 

1988 births
Living people
German people of Moroccan descent
Citizens of Morocco through descent
German sportspeople of African descent
Moroccan footballers
German footballers
Footballers from Düsseldorf
Association football midfielders
Morocco international footballers
Morocco under-20 international footballers
Bundesliga players
2. Bundesliga players
3. Liga players
Persian Gulf Pro League players
English Football League players
1. FC Köln players
1. FC Köln II players
Fulham F.C. players
Esteghlal F.C. players
FSV Frankfurt players
Ittihad Tanger players
Moroccan expatriate footballers
German expatriate footballers
Moroccan expatriate sportspeople in England
German expatriate sportspeople in England
Expatriate footballers in England
Moroccan expatriate sportspeople in Iran
German expatriate sportspeople in Iran
Expatriate footballers in Iran